Bugs is a British television drama series that ran for four seasons from 1 April 1995 to 28 August 1999. The programme, a mixture of action/adventure and science fiction, involved a team of independent crime-fighting technology experts, who faced a variety of threats involving computers and other modern technology. It was originally broadcast on Saturday evenings on BBC One, and was produced for the BBC by the independent production company Carnival Films. In July 2014, London Live, a local digital terrestrial station in London, began airing a complete rerun from Series 1.
All 4 series (40 episodes) are available to stream in the UK on Britbox.

Overview
The series was devised by Carnival boss Brian Eastman and producer Stuart Doughty with input from veteran writer-producer Brian Clemens, who had previously worked on ITV's The Avengers and The Professionals. Clemens described Bugs as "an Avengers for the 1990s". Other notable series writers included Colin Brake and Stephen Gallagher. Two episodes ("Bugged Wheat" and "Hollow Man"), were written by Alfred Gough and Miles Millar, who went on to create the series Smallville. The theme tune was written by Gavin Greenaway.
The programme was a mixture of action/adventure and science fiction, with a reliance on fast-paced plots, technical gadgetry, stunts and explosions. Much of the programme's filming took place around the London Docklands area, which had recently been redeveloped with projects such as Canary Wharf. This was intended to give a modern, and perhaps even slightly futuristic, feel to locations of the episodes. The production was originally based at two warehouses of Blackwall Basin, on the Isle of Dogs in London. After the IRA bombing of the South Quay Plaza, the crew had to travel further to find intact buildings for exterior locations.

The plot of the programme involved a team of specialist independent crime-fighting technology experts, who faced a variety of threats involving computers and other modern technology. The main trio of regulars were Nick Beckett (Jesse Birdsall), Ros Henderson (Jaye Griffiths) and Ed (Craig McLachlan in series one to three, Steven Houghton in series four). Initially an independent team, they began working alongside the government agency 'Bureau of Weapons Technology' in series two and from series three, with the original Bureau decimated, they came under the authority of the newly created Bureau 2, whose head was codenamed Jan (Jan Harvey) (her real first name was revealed to be Barbara, but her surname was never given) and her secretary, Alex Jordan (Paula Hunt). The series evolved, as a result, from a series of relatively unconnected one-off episodes to an overarching 'soap opera' complete with office romances. There has been controversy over Ed's surname - because he was never called anything other than "Ed", some people have taken his surname to be Russell, simply because he was addressed as "Dr Russell" in one episode. However, that was more likely a pseudonym, as both Ros and Beckett used plenty of false names throughout the series.

The programme came close to cancellation at the conclusion of its third series, but due to an exciting cliffhanger ending deliberately included by the production team, and strong foreign sales, a fourth was commissioned. The final series suffered from being moved to an earlier timeslot on Saturday evenings, and for only having the first eight of its produced ten episodes scheduled for broadcast. Coupled with the Omagh Bombing forcing the BBC to postpone the series for a week, this meant that the concluding three episodes would not be broadcast until a year later. Another attempt to save the show by giving the series a cliffhanger ending was not successful, and the ending of the final episode — where Alex has just married boyfriend Adam, only to have him killed at the wedding and Ros and Beckett are abducted by an attacker unseen by the audience but recognised by Beckett — was never resolved.

The series has something of a minor cult following in the UK. Overall 40 episodes were produced, ten in each of the four series. Virgin Publishing produced novelizations of the episodes of the first series, but these were not successful and subsequent episodes were not novelised. As of 2005, the series is available on DVD in series-by-series box set form, released by Revelation Films. A complete box set collection of all four series is also available.
In 2022, the series became available on the BritBox streaming platform.

Cast
 Jaye Griffiths as Rosalyn "Ros" Henderson
 Jesse Birdsall as Nicholas Beckett
 Craig McLachlan as Ed (Series 1–3)
 Jan Harvey as Jan (Series 3–4)
 Paula Hunt as Alex Jordan (Series 3–4)
 Martin McDougall as Lacombe (Series 1–2)
 Steven Houghton as Ed (Series 4)
 Gareth Marks as Jean-Daniel Marcel (Series 1–2)
 Michael Grandage as Channing Hardy (Series 3–4)
 Joseph May as Adam Mosby (Series 4)

Episodes

Series 1 (1995)

Series 2 (1996)

Series 3 (1997)

Series 4 (1998–1999)

References

External links
 
 
 

1990s British drama television series
1995 British television series debuts
1999 British television series endings
BBC television dramas
1990s British science fiction television series
Television shows set in London
Television series about computing
English-language television shows